Vexillum altisuturatum is a species of sea snail, a marine gastropod mollusk, in the family Costellariidae, the ribbed miters.

Description
The length of the shell attains 5.2 mm.

Distribution
This marine species occurs off the Philippines.

References

 Chino M. & Herrmann M. (2014) A new species of Vexillum (Costellaria) (Gastropoda: Costellariidae) from the Philippines and the Solomon Islands. Visaya 4(2): 4-8.

altisuturatum
Gastropods described in 2014